GreenOrder was a management consulting group specialising in environmental sustainability.  It was established in 2000 by Andrew L. Shapiro.

History 
Shapiro got the idea for GreenOrder from the Wetlands Preserve, an environmentally friendly nightclub in the TriBeCa area of New York City.

GreenOrder was acquired by LRN in 2008 and operated as a wholly owned subsidiary. In 2012, GreenOrder was merged with Cleantech Group LLC. GreenOrder no longer exists as a separate entity.

Notable work 
GreenOrder worked with companies like Polo Ralph Lauren and General Motors. It worked with Saudi Basic Industries (SABIC) in making investments in green technologies and products.

In 2011, GreenOrder Partner Truman Semans took part in delivering the keynote addresses at the World Future Energy Summit in Abu Dhabi.

GreenOrder served as a principal strategic adviser on General Electric's ecomagination portfolio, including involvement in the ecomagination Product Review process.

References

External links 
 GreenOrder Official Site
 
 

Sustainability advocates
Companies based in Manhattan
Renewable resource companies established in 2000
American companies established in 2000
Renewable resource companies disestablished in 2012
American companies disestablished in 2012